William Clifford Newman (August 16, 1928 – May 20, 2017) was an American clergyman of the Roman Catholic Church. He served as an auxiliary bishop of the Archdiocese of Baltimore from 1984 to 2003.

Biography
William Newman was born in Baltimore, Maryland, and graduated from Calvert Hall College in 1946. He then entered St. Charles College in Catonsville, and later earned a Bachelor of Arts degree from St. Mary's Seminary in 1950. In 1954, he received a Licentiate of Sacred Theology from the Catholic University of America in Washington, D.C. He was ordained to the priesthood on May 29, 1954. His first assignment was as assistant pastor at St. Elizabeth Church in Baltimore.

From 1962 to 1967, Newman served as the first principal of St. Paul's Latin High School. He was raised to the rank of Papal Chamberlain by Pope Paul VI in June 1965. That same year, he received a Master's degree from Loyola College. From 1967 to 1976, he served as superintendent of Catholic schools in the Archdiocese of Baltimore. During this time, he also became involved in several civic and religious organizations, and served as Secretary of Education for the archdiocese (1972-1974). He became pastor of SS. Philip and James Church in 1976, and rector of the Cathedral of Mary Our Queen in 1981.

On May 25, 1984, Newman was appointed an auxiliary bishop for Baltimore and titular Bishop of Numluli by Pope John Paul II. He received his episcopal ordination on the following July 2 from Archbishop William Borders, with Bishops Thomas Murphy and Eugene Marino, S.S.J., serving as co-consecrators. As an auxiliary bishop, he served as vicar general and episcopal vicar for the Eastern Vicariate of the archdiocese.

Within the United States Conference of Catholic Bishops, he served as a member of the Committees on Education, Religious Life and Ministry, and on Women in the Church and Society. He also has represented the U.S. bishops in the Catholic-Jewish Consultations under the Committee on Interreligious and Ecumenical Affairs. In 1997, he was elected to the Board of Directors of Catholic Relief Services.

After reaching the mandatory retirement age of 75, Newman resigned as an auxiliary bishop on August 28, 2003. Bishop Newman died in hospice in Timonium, Maryland on May 20, 2017 at the age of 88.

See also 

 Catholic Church hierarchy
 Catholic Church in the United States
 Historical list of the Catholic bishops of the United States
 List of Catholic bishops of the United States
 Lists of patriarchs, archbishops, and bishops

References

1928 births
2017 deaths
Religious leaders from Baltimore
20th-century Roman Catholic bishops in the United States
St. Charles College alumni
St. Mary's Seminary and University alumni
Catholic University of America alumni
21st-century Roman Catholic bishops in the United States